Mordor, also known as Mordor in Domaniewska, is an informal name for the area, mostly composed of office buildings, in the city of Warsaw, Poland, located within the neighbourhoods of Służewiec (Służewiec Przemysłowy) and western Ksawerów in the district of Mokotów. Its boundaries are commonly accepted to be Cybernetyki, Domaniewska, Marynarska, and Wołoska Streets. The area is mostly composed of office buildings, including the headquarters of branches of many multinational corporations.

It is named after Mordor, a fictional location in the 1954–1955 fantasy novel The Lord of the Rings written by J. R. R. Tolkien. The local government had refused to officially recognize the name of the area. However, in 2022, two streets in the area had been named after J. R. R. Tolkien, and Gandalf (character from the novel), in reference to the unofficial name.

Characteristics 

The area in the city of Warsaw, Poland, known informally as Mordor, is located within the neighbourhoods of Służewiec (Służewiec Przemysłowy) and western Ksawerów in the district of Mokotów. Its boundaries are commonly accepted to be Cybernetyki, Domaniewska, Marynarska, and Wołoska Streets.

The area mostly consists of office buildings, counting over 100 of them. It include headquarters of the branches of many multinational corporations. According to the estimates, to the area commutes between 80 and 100 thousand employees, and that the 87% of the employees of the corporations were of aga between 20 and 39 years, with the biggest group, counting 39%, being people from ages between 26 and 30 years.

The huge amount of people commuting to and from the area every day, together with local road systems not designed for such number of vehicles, is causing the area to be regularly sight of massive traffic congestion, as well as lack of parking spaces. Many candidates cite difficulties in commute, as main reason for turning down offers to work in the area.

In March 2019, the average number of area not being rented, was equal to 19.8%, with the average for the whole city of Warsaw, being 9.1%.

History 

In 1952, the area of modern Służewiec Przemysłowy, had been designated as the industrial area of the Industrial–Storage District of Służewiec (Polish: Dzielnica Przemysłowo-Składowa „Służewiec”), marking the beginning of the construction of the industrial factories and magazines there. It covered an area of around 2.6 km2 (1 sq mi). In the early 1970s, in the area worked around 20 000 people.

In the 1990s, the industrial activity in the area of Służewiec Przemysłowy and nearby western part of Ksawerów, went to a hold. As such, it had caused the appearance on the Real estate market of huge and developed estates, located near the city centre and the Warsaw Chopin Airport. It had then contributed to the development of business industry in the area, and eventually leading to the creation of the biggest complex of office buildings in Poland One of the first of new infestations in the area was the construction of Curtis Plaza office building in 1992, located at 18 Wołoska Street. From 1995 to 2001, in the area had been build the complex of office buildings known as Mokotów Business Park, located in the area of Domaniewska and Postępu Streets. In 2000, in the area had been opened Westfield Mokotów (originally known as Galeria Mokotów), one of the biggest shopping centres in the city. By 2019, in the area had been build 83 office buildings. They were mostly build without city oversight, and contributed to the development of the office monoculture. In 2019, the area begun losing its status of office centre, to the district of Wola.

Name 

Due to terrible traffic congestion, area begun being informally referred to as Mordor, and Mordor in Domaniewska, in the reference to Mordor, a fictional location, and personification of evil, from the 1954–1955 fantasy novel The Lord of the Rings written by J. R. R. Tolkien.

While locally used prior to that, the name had been popularized by Facebook fan page titled Mordor na Domaniewskiej (translation from Polish: Mordor in Domaniewska), established in 2013, by one of the employees from the area. In 2018, the fansite had gained 100 000 followers, and by February 2022, it has over 170 000. In the city is also published magazine Głos Mordoru (translation from Polish: The Voice of Mordor), addresseed to the employees of the corporations from the area.

Accordingly, the corporate employees in the area, area informally referred to as orcs (Polish: orki), in reference to the fictional literacy race of orcs, prominently featured in Tolkien's The Lord of the Rings. In the book, they inhabited fictional Mordor. The name was coined as the commentary on the rat race culture, that many of the employees engage in, as comparison to the slavery work performed by the orcs in the book, to their master and ruler of Mordor, Sauron.

There were several attempts to make Mordor the officially recognized name of the area. In 2015, its supporters had hang a street sign with name Mordor in the area, which however quickly taken down by the authorities. In 2018, the local inhabitants had proposed via the participatory budgeting, the recognition of the name, which however was not approved. Since 2015, the name is accepted in the search of the Google Maps.

On 12 December 2020, following the petition of local inhabitants, two small streets in the neighbourhood of Służewiec were named in reference to Mordor. One of them is J. R. R. Tolkiena Street, named after J. R. R. Tolkien, and which goes perpendicularly to the south from Suwak Street. The other is Gandalfa Street, named after Gandalf, one of main characters from Tolkien's The Hobbit and The Lord of the Rings, and which goes perpendicularly to the north from Konstruktorska Street. Both roads meet in their middle, forming a crossing. They were originally intended to be named Pirytowa and Tytanowa Streets, however, the local councilpeople had decided to name them in reference to Tolkien, following the petitioning of the local population.

See also 
 Służewiec Przemysłowy

Notes

References 

Neighbourhoods of Mokotów
Tolkien fandom
Things named after Tolkien works